Jamyangiin Mönkhbat (born 1979) is a Mongolian politician. He graduated from the National University of Mongolia in 2001. His career began as an Organizer at office of Speaker of the Parliament. Later he worked as an assistant to Speaker of the Parliament. In 2005, he became an assistant to Office of President. Then, he was appointed as the Secretary General of the Social Democracy Mongolian Youth Union (2005–2007), President of Mongolian Youth Development Association (2008–2010), Deputy Head of standing committee on political policy, Board of Mongolian People’s Party (2010–2011), Chief Editor of Mongolyn Ünen daily newspaper (2011–2012) and Secretary of Mongolian People’s Party and Vice President of Social Democracy Mongolian Youth Union (2012 to 2013).  He was elected as Secretary General of Mongolian People’s Party in 2013.

References

Sources
https://web.archive.org/web/20141129034133/http://nam.mn/member/28

1979 births
Living people
Mongolian People's Party politicians
People from Arkhangai Province
National University of Mongolia alumni